This article is a technical description of the phonetics and phonology of Korean. Unless otherwise noted, statements in this article refer to South Korean standard language based on the Seoul dialect.

Morphophonemes are written inside double slashes, phonemes inside slashes, and allophones inside brackets.

Consonants
Korean has 19 consonant phonemes.

For each stop and affricate, there is a three-way contrast between unvoiced segments, which are distinguished as plain, tense, and aspirated.
The "plain" segments, sometimes referred to as "lax" or "lenis," are considered to be the more "basic" or unmarked members of the Korean obstruent series. The "plain" segments are also distinguished from the tense and aspirated phonemes by changes in vowel quality, including a relatively lower pitch of the following vowel.
The "tense" segments, also referred to as "fortis," "hard," or "glottalized," have eluded precise description and have been the subject of considerable phonetic investigation. As it was suggested from the Middle Korean spelling, the tense consonants came from the initial consonant clusters sC-, pC-, psC-.
The "aspirated" segments are characterized by aspiration, a burst of air accompanied by the delayed onset of voicing.

Korean syllable structure is maximally CGVC, where G is a glide . (There is a unique off-glide diphthong in the character 의 that combines the sounds  and  creating ). Any consonant except  may occur initially, but only  may occur finally. Sequences of two consonants may occur between vowels.

Plain 
 are voiced  between sonorants (including all vowels and certain consonants) but voiceless elsewhere.

Aspirated 
 are strongly aspirated, more so than English voiceless stops. They generally do not undergo intervocalic voicing, but a 2020 study reports that it still occurs in around 10~15% of cases. It is more prevalent among older male speakers who have aspirated stops voiced in as much as 28% of cases.

Tense 
The IPA diacritic , resembling a subscript double straight quotation mark, shown here with a placeholder circle, is used to denote the tensed consonants . Its official use in the Extensions to the IPA is for strong articulation, but is used in literature for faucalized voice. The Korean consonants also have elements of stiff voice, but it is not yet known how typical that is of faucalized consonants. Sometimes the tense consonants are marked with an apostrophe, but that is not IPA usage; in the IPA, the apostrophe indicates ejective consonants. Some works use full-size  or small  before tensed consonants, this notation is generally used to denote pre-glottalization. Asterisk  after a tensed consonant is also used in literature.

They are produced with a partially constricted glottis and additional subglottal pressure in addition to tense vocal tract walls, laryngeal lowering, or other expansion of the larynx. 
 An alternative analysis proposes that the "tensed" series of sounds are (fundamentally) regular voiceless, unaspirated consonants: the "lax" sounds are voiced consonants that become devoiced initially, and the primary distinguishing feature between word-initial "lax" and "tensed" consonants is that initial lax sounds cause the following vowel to assume a low-to-high pitch contour, a feature reportedly associated with voiced consonants in many Asian languages (such as Shanghainese), whereas tensed (and also aspirated) consonants are associated with a uniformly high pitch.

Vowels before tense consonants (as well as aspirated) tend to be shorter than before lax stops.

The Gyeongsang dialect is known for realization of tense   as plain  .

Fricatives 
  does not occur in final position, though the sound  does occur at the end of non-final syllables, where it affects the following consonant. (See below.) Intervocalically, it is realized as voiced , and after voiced consonants it is either  or silent.

Similarly to plain stops, it shows moderate aspiration word-initially but no aspiration word-medially. It also often undergoes intervocalic voicing. But similar to aspirated stops, it triggers high pitch in the following vowel.

Sonorants 
Sonorants resemble vowels in a sense that plain stops become voiced between a sonorant or a vowel and another vowel.

  tend to be denasalized word-initially. 

  does not occur in initial position, reflected in the way the hangeul jamo  has a different pronunciation in the initial position to the final position.

There is free variation at the beginning of a word, where this phoneme tends to become  before most vowels and silent before , but it is commonly  in English loanwords.

In native Korean words,   does not occur word initially, unlike in Chinese loans (Sino-Korean vocabulary).

 "labour" – North Korea: , South Korea: 
 "history" – North Korea: , South Korea: 

 "female" – North Korea: , South Korea: 

In both countries, initial  in words of foreign origin other than Chinese is pronounced . Very old speakers may pronounce word-initial  as  even in Western loanwords, e.g. in "writer"  .

The features of consonants are summed up in the following table.

Clusters 
Morphemes may also end in CC clusters, which are  both expressed only when they are followed by a vowel.

{| class="wikitable"
|- style="text-align: center;"
! Sequence
! 
! 
! 
! 
! 
! 
! 
! colspan="2" |
! 
! 
! 
|- style="text-align: center;"
! Medial allophone
| 
| 
| 
| 
| 
| 
| 
| colspan="2" |[lb]
| 
| 
| 
|- style="text-align: center;"
! Final allophone
| colspan="2" | 
| colspan="2" | 
| colspan="4" |
| colspan="3" |
| 
|}

When such a sequence is followed by a consonant, the same reduction takes place, but a trace of the lost consonant may remain in its effect on the following consonant. The effects are the same as in a sequence between vowels: an elided obstruent will leave the third consonant fortis, if it is a stop, and an elided  will leave it aspirated. Most conceivable combinations do not actually occur; a few examples are  = ,  = ,  = ,  = ,  = ,  = ; also  = , as  has no effect on a following , and  = , with the  dropping out.

An elided  has no effect:  = ,  = ,  = ,  = ,  = ,  = ,  = ,  = ,  = ,  = ,   = .

Positional allophones 
Korean consonants have three principal positional allophones: initial, medial (voiced), and final (checked). The initial form is found at the beginning of phonological words. Nasal consonants do not have noticeable positional allophones beyond initial denasalization, and  cannot appear in this position.

The table below is out of alphabetical order to make the relationships between the consonants explicit:

Palatalization 

 are pronounced  in Seoul, but typically pronounced  in Pyongyang. Similarly,  are palatalized as  before  in Seoul. In Pyongyang they remain unchanged. This pronunciation may be also found in Seoul Korean among some speakers, especially before back vowels.

As noted above, initial  is silent in this palatalizing environment, at least in South Korea.

In many morphological processes, a vowel  before another vowel may become the semivowel .

Consonant assimilation 
Tenuis stops become fortis after obstruents (which, as noted above, are reduced to ); that is,  is pronounced . For example, underlying  is pronounced .

These are all progressive assimilation. Korean also has regressive (anticipatory) assimilation: a consonant tends to assimilate in manner but not in place of articulation: Obstruents become nasal stops before nasal stops (which, as just noted, includes underlying ), but do not change their position in the mouth. Velar stops (that is, all consonants pronounced  in final position) become ; coronals become , and labials become . For example,  is pronounced  (phonetically ).

Before the fricatives , coronal obstruents assimilate to a fricative, resulting in a geminate. That is,  is pronounced . A final  assimilates in both place and manner, so that  is pronounced as a geminate (and, as noted above, aspirated if C is a stop).

There are lexical exceptions to these generalizations.

 Final labial obstruents:  ,  

Hangul orthography does not generally reflect these assimilatory processes, but rather maintains the underlying morphology in most cases.

Vowels

Most Standard Korean speakers have seven vowel phonemes.

Korean  is phonetically .

But, the data from one study suggests that while younger KCTV anchors try to produce them more or less distinctly, it is not clear whether that is learned or natural pronunciation, as they do so inconsistently. Notably, older anchor Ri Chun-hee and even Kim Jong-un both have  and  merged.

In Gyeongsang dialect,  and  once have merged into  in speech of older speakers, but they are distinct among young and middle-aged Daegu residents (they actually have the same vowels as Seoulites due to influence from Standard Korean).

In Seoul,  is fronted, while  is raised, and both are almost the same height, though  is still more rounded.

Diphthongs and glides

In modern pronunciation,  merges into  after a consonant.

Modern Korean has no falling diphthongs, with sequences like  being considered as two separate vowels in hiatus.

The sequences  do not occur, and it is not possible to write them using standard hangul. The semivowel  occurs only in the diphthong , and is prone to being deleted after a consonant.

Loss of vowel length contrast 

Korean used to have length distinction for each vowel, but this is now reported to be almost completely neutralized (though it is still prescriptive). Long vowels were pronounced somewhat more peripherally than short ones - for most of the speakers who still utilize vowel length contrastively, long  is actually .

Vowel length is a remnant of high tone, first emerging in Middle Korean. It was preserved only in first syllables and was often neutralized, particularly in following cases:
 In compound words:   "man", but   "snowman";   "to open, to spread", but   "to brag".
 In most monosyllabic verbs when attaching a suffix starting in a vowel (  "to starve", but  ;   "to put", but  ), or a suffix changing transitivity (  "to swell up", but   "to soak";   "to twist", but   "to be entangled").

It has disappeared gradually in younger speakers, but some middle-aged speakers are still aware of it and can produce it in conscious speech. The long-short merger had two main aspects: the first is phonetic - the duration of long vowels in relation to short ones have reduced by a lot (from 2.5:1 in the 1960s to 1.5:1 in the 2000s). Some studies suggest that the length of all vowels is dependent on the age (older speakers have slower speech rate and even their short vowels are produced relatively longer than younger speakers). The second aspect is lexical - the subset of words produced with long vowels has gotten smaller, the long vowels tend to reduce particularly in high-frequency words.

Vowel harmony 

Traditionally, the Korean language has had strong vowel harmony; that is, in pre-modern Korean, not only did the inflectional and derivational affixes (such as postpositions) change in accordance to the main root vowel, but native words also adhered to vowel harmony.  It is not universally prevalent in modern usage, but it remains in onomatopoeia, adjectives and adverbs, interjections, and conjugation. There are also other traces of vowel harmony in Korean.

There are three classes of vowels in Korean: "positive", "negative", and "neutral". The vowel  (eu) is considered both partially neutral and partially negative. The vowel classes loosely follow the negative and positive vowels; they also follow orthography. Exchanging positive vowels with negative vowels usually creates different nuances of meaning, with positive vowels representing diminutives and negative vowels representing exaggeration:

Onomatopoeia:
Emphasized adjectives:
Particles at the end of verbs:
  (to catch) →  (caught)
  (to fold) →  (folded)
Interjections:
  and  expressing surprise, discomfort or sympathy
  and  expressing sudden realization and mild objection, respectively
While these vowels change, it is important to note that one is aware of just slight differences when speaking Korean. There are many minimal pairs in Korean in which a change of sound can alter the meaning of the word or sentence spoken completely. 

 별 'star' (byeol  with normal pitch) and 펼 'unfold' (pyeol  with higher pitch)
 이 가방이 싸요 'this bag is cheap' (i gabang-i ssayo ) 이 가방이 사요 'This bag buys' (i gabang-i sayo )

Accent and pitch 
In modern Standard Korean, in multisyllabic words the second syllable has high pitch that gradually comes down in subsequent syllables.

A 2013 study by Kang Yoon-jung and Han Sung-woo which compared voice recordings of Seoul speech from 1935 and 2005 found that in recent years, lenis consonants (ㅂㅈㄷㄱ), aspirated consonants (ㅍㅊㅌㅋ) and fortis consonants (ㅃㅉㄸㄲ) were shifting from a distinction via voice onset time to that of pitch change, and suggests that the modern Seoul dialect is currently undergoing tonogenesis. Kim Mi-Ryoung (2013) notes that these sound shifts still show variations among different speakers, suggesting that the transition is still ongoing. Cho Sung-hye (2017) examined 141 Seoul dialect speakers, and concluded that these pitch changes were originally initiated by females born in the 1950s, and has almost reached completion in the speech of those born in the 1990s. On the other hand, Choi Ji-youn et al. (2020) disagree with the suggestion that the consonant distinction shifting away from voice onset time is due to the introduction of tonal features, and instead proposes that it is a prosodically conditioned change.

Dialectal pitch accents 
Several dialects outside Seoul retain the Middle Korean pitch accent system. In the dialect of Northern Gyeongsang, in southeastern South Korea, any syllable may have pitch accent in the form of a high tone, as may the two initial syllables. For example, in trisyllabic words, there are four possible tone patterns:
   'daughter-in-law'
   'mother'
   'native speaker'
   'elder brother'

Age differences 
The following changes have been observed since the mid-20th century and by now are widespread, at least in South Korea.
 Contrastive vowel length has disappeared. Although still prescriptive, in 2012, the vowel length is reported to be almost completely neutralized in Korean, except for a very few older speakers of Seoul dialect, for whom the distinctive vowel length distinction is maintained only in the first syllable of a word. Even amongst those middle-aged speakers who retain the distinction, the phonetic contrast between a long vowel and a short vowel has shrunk to 1.5:1, compared to 2.5:1 recorded in the 1960s; additionally, the number of lexical items featuring long vowels has also reduced, with low-frequency words being more likely to retain long vowels than high-frequency ones. Vowel length has subsequently become a prosodic feature of the language, used mainly for emphasis, and placed typically on the first syllable of the word.
A number of homophones have appeared due to this change, and speakers may employ different strategies to distinguish them.

Some changes are still ongoing. They depend on age and gender, the speech of young females tends to be most innovative, while old males are phonologically conservative.
 Plain stops in word-initial position are becoming as aspirated as "true" aspirated stops. They are still distinguished by their pitch, which indicates ongoing tonogenesis in Contemporary Seoul Korean. This is however contested by studies which explain this as a prosodic feature.
 Some words experience tensification of initial plain consonants, in both native and Sino-Korean words. It is proscribed in normative Standard Korean, but may be widespread or occur in free variation in certain words. Examples:
   "1) thorn; 2) worm" is pronounced  
   "to polish" is pronounced  
   "a little" is pronounced  ,  
 Tensification is very common in Western loanwords:   "badge",   "bus",   "jam", although also proscribed in South Korea.

Notes

References

Further reading

Phonologies by language
Korean language